The Sanctuary and Monastery of Las Nazarenas is a church in Lima and  is the site of the Peruvian Catholic procession of the Lord of Miracles, Señor de los Milagros, who is also the patron of the city. It was constructed together with the Monastery of Nazarenas, after a major earthquake it was finally completed in 1771

From this church begins America's most important religious procession on October 18 and 28.

See also
 Lord of Miracles
List of buildings in Lima

External links 

Roman Catholic churches completed in 1771
Roman Catholic churches in Lima
Carmelite churches
Rococo architecture in Peru
17th-century establishments in the Spanish Empire
18th-century Roman Catholic church buildings in Peru
Cultural heritage of Peru